Paulo Henrique Pereira da Silva (born 26 June 1998), commonly known as Paulinho, Paulinho Bóia or Paulo Bóia, is a Brazilian professional footballer who plays as a forward for J.League club Kyoto Sanga, on loan from Metalist Kharkiv.

Career statistics

Club

Notes

Honours
São Paulo
Campeonato Paulista: 2021

References

1998 births
Living people
Brazilian footballers
Brazilian expatriate footballers
Association football forwards
Campeonato Brasileiro Série A players
Primeira Liga players
São Paulo FC players
Portimonense S.C. players
Esporte Clube São Bento players
Esporte Clube Juventude players
FC Metalist Kharkiv players
América Futebol Clube (MG) players
Expatriate footballers in Portugal
Brazilian expatriate sportspeople in Portugal
Expatriate footballers in Ukraine
Brazilian expatriate sportspeople in Ukraine
Footballers from Brasília